Guenthera may refer to the following plants:
 Guenthera, a genus in the family Brassicaceae
 Guenthera, a synonym of Xanthocephalum, a genus in the family Asteraceae

See also 
 Guentheria (disambiguation), several genera